Yutong Su ( was born in Beijing) is a Chinese journalist, internet activist and human rights defender.

Biography 
After four years as journalist, she decided to become an independent internet activist and as well to work for an NGO assisting vulnerable groups in defending their rights, especially in the field of water pollution and HIV/AIDS through blood transfusions.

In solidarity with the human rights lawyer Ni Yulan, she organised a protest against the Vice Minister Wu Hao of the Yunnan Provincial Propaganda Department.

She was involved in commemoration events linked to the Tiananmen suppression and in solidarity actions for human rights defenders.

As a consequence she was “invited for tea” and for “chats” by the Chinese authorities and kept under surveillance and periodically placed under house arrest.

When in 2010, she distributed Li Peng's Diary, a book forbidden by the authorities, her home was raided and documents were confiscated by the police.

Because of her activities, the Beijing security department informed Sina (one of the biggest social media network sites in China) in 2010 to block her name completely as it was deemed "sensitive". Her five email accounts at Sina were deleted as well.

With the help of international NGOs and friends, she managed to leave the country and is now living in Germany.

From Germany she continued her Chinese human rights work: she organised and participated in different solidarity actions, among others for the artist Ai Weiwei.

Career 
In 2010 she started working in Bonn with Deutsche Welle (DW), the German International public TV.

When on 4 July 2014 a Beijing-based media consultant criticised in DW that some Western media were unfairly critical of the Chinese government crushing of the Tiananmen demonstrations. On 19 August 2019 DW decided to not continue the cooperation with her.

The New York Times (21 August 2014) and the German Journalists Association DJV (11 September 2014) criticized this decision of DW.

Yutong Su is currently working for Radio Free Asia (RFA).

References

People's Republic of China journalists
1976 births
Living people